Bridgeport  is a local service district and designated place in the Canadian province of Newfoundland and Labrador. Services in Bridgeport include the local grocery store, a post office and a fish plant. Bridgeport also now features a newly updated community hall.

Geography 
Bridgeport is in Newfoundland within Subdivision H of Division No. 8. Bridgeport is on New World Island.

Demographics 

Government 
Bridgeport is a local service district (LSD) that is governed by a committee responsible for the provision of certain services to the community. The chair of the LSD committee is Sherman Jennings.

See also 
List of communities in Newfoundland and Labrador
List of designated places in Newfoundland and Labrador
List of local service districts in Newfoundland and Labrador

References 

Designated places in Newfoundland and Labrador
Local service districts in Newfoundland and Labrador